North Station is a train station in Boston, Massachusetts, United States. The adjacent North Station (subway) serves the MBTA subway system.

Other train stations with the word north in their names include:

Argentina
 Mar del Plata railway station
 Rosario Norte Station
Belgium
 Brussels-North railway station
 Maastricht Noord railway station
China
 Beijing North railway station
 Guangzhou North railway station
 Qingdao North railway station
 Shenzhen North Station
 Shenyang North railway station 
 Suizhong North railway station
 Zhongshan North railway station
 Zhuhai North railway station
Denmark
 Hadsund North Station
 Køge Nord station
France
 Amiens station (Gare du Nord)
 Paris Gare du Nord
 Gare du Nord (Paris Métro)
 Gare de Metz-Nord, Metz
 Gare de Mulhouse-Nord, Mulhouse
Germany
 Berlin Nordbahnhof
 Berlin Old Nordbahnhof
 Bochum-Nord station
 Braunschweig Nord station, Braunschweig
 Darmstadt Nord station
 Ingolstadt Nord station
 Strausberg Nord station
 Stuttgart Nord station
Italy
 Busto Arsizio Nord railway station
 Novara Nord railway station
 Varese Nord railway station
Netherlands
 Alkmaar Noord railway station
 Barneveld Noord railway station
 Groningen Noord railway station
 Rotterdam Noord railway station
 Sneek Noord railway station
 Waddinxveen Noord railway station
Romania
 Bucharest North railway station
 Timișoara North railway station
Russia
 Kaliningrad North railway station
Spain
 Estació del Nord (Barcelona)
 Estación del Norte (Burgos), Burgos
 Príncipe Pío (Madrid Metro) (Estación del Norte)
 San Sebastián railway station (Estación del Norte)
 Oviedo railway station (Estación del Norte)
 Estació del Nord (Valencia)
 Estación del Norte (Zaragoza)
Sweden
 Arlanda North Station
 Stockholm North Station
Switzerland
 Bern Bümpliz Nord railway station
 Bischofszell Nord railway station
 Corcelles-Nord railway station
 Grenchen Nord railway station
 Kehrsatz Nord railway station
 Pully-Nord railway station
 Sarnen Nord railway station
 Vaulruz-Nord railway station, Vaulruz
United Kingdom
 Bicester North railway station
 Birkenhead North railway station
 Blackpool North railway station
 Bloxwich North railway station
 Bromley North railway station
 Chessington North railway station
 Dunstable North railway station
 Farnborough North railway station
 Hertford North railway station
 Livingston North railway station
 Oulton Broad North railway station
 Saltcoats North railway station
 Ramsey North railway station
 Reddish North railway station
 Thorne North railway station
 Watford North railway station
 Welwyn North railway station
 Wisbech North railway station
 Workington North railway station

Other
 North Station (Station Nord), a 2002 Canadian film directed by Jean-Claude Lord

See also 

 North Avenue station (disambiguation)

 Estación del Norte (disambiguation)
 Nordbahnhof (disambiguation)
 Gare du Nord (disambiguation)
 Estació del Nord (disambiguation)

 South Station (disambiguation)
 East Station (disambiguation)
 West station (disambiguation)